Seter is a village in the municipality of Osen in Trøndelag county, Norway.  It is located along the Svesfjorden in the northern part of the municipality, although it has no direct road connection to the southern part of the municipality.  The only road connection is to the neighboring municipality of Flatanger to the north.

Seter Chapel is located in the village.  The Buholmråsa Lighthouse and Kya Lighthouse are both located to the northwest of the village.

References

Osen
Villages in Trøndelag